

This article presents a timeline of events in the history of the United Kingdom from 1930 AD until 1949 AD. For a narrative explaining the overall developments, see the related History of the British Isles. For narratives about this time period, see Interwar Britain, United Kingdom home front during World War II, Military History of the United Kingdom during World War II, Postwar Britain (1945–1979), Social history of Postwar Britain (1945–1979),

United Kingdom

England

Scotland

Wales

See also 
 Timeline of British history
 History of England
 History of Northern Ireland
 History of Scotland
 History of Wales
 History of the United Kingdom

British history timelines